Lecythis parvifructa is a species of woody plant in the Lecythidaceae family. It is found only in Brazil. It is threatened by habitat loss.

References

parvifructa
Flora of Brazil
Vulnerable plants
Taxonomy articles created by Polbot